John Pattison may refer to:

John Pattison (RNZAF officer) (1917-2009), New Zealand World War II pilot
John M. Pattison (1847-1906), American politician  
Jack Pattison (1887-1970), English footballer
John George Pattison (1875–1917), Canadian Victoria Cross recipient
 John Pattison (priest), Dean of Ardfert 1916-1918
 John Pattison (puppeteer), Puppeteer (born 1974)

See also
John Patteson (disambiguation)